Flick Home Run! is a baseball phone game developed by Infinity Pocket. The game released on October 15, 2011. The game is available on mobile devices using Apple's iOS as both a free version and a paid version. The free version has only two play modes, while the paid version, which costs $0.99, has five play modes. Flick Home Run! free version is obtainable only for Google Play Store.

Gameplay
In Flick Home Run! you place your finger in the lower-left corner of the screen (the button that says "Pitch") and await a baseball to be pitched to you. Once the ball crosses a vertical line called the "hit zone," you can then swipe your finger on your touchscreen to take a swing at the ball. Depending on the game mode, your object is to either hit the ball as far as possible, or to land the ball in a specific zone, or to hit the ball in an arc that will collide with certain bonus objects on the level. If you miss the ball enough times, the game ends. The object of the game is to get as high a score as possible.

Reception
Flick Home Run! was generally well received by critics, receiving a score of 4 stars out of 5 from Touch Arcade reviewer Marcus Troy Adams, who stated the game is "a simple concept which is well-executed by Infinity Pocket." Slide to Play reviewer Riordan Frost gave the game a 3 out of 4, suggesting "the gameplay is fun enough that even non-sports fans will probably get a kick out of Flick Home Run."

References

2011 video games
Baseball video games
IOS games